Olomouc Orthodox Church or Church of St. Gorazd is an Orthodox Christian church in the city of Olomouc in Moravia, in the Czech Republic. It was built and consecrated in 1939 and dedicated to St. Gorazd (Slavic enlightener in the 9th century). In 1950 it became a cathedral, because Olomouc is the seat of the Olomouc-Brno eparchy.

The church was repaired in 1985–1987. In 1987, the church saw the canonization of Bishop Gorazd of Prague as St. Gorazd II. Bishop Gorazd had been executed by the Nazis in 1942 for hiding the paratroopers who assassinated Reinhard Heydrich.

References

 This article is based on a translation of the equivalent article on Czech Wikipedia

Churches in the Czech Republic
Churches in Olomouc
Churches completed in 1939
Cathedrals in the Czech Republic
20th-century religious buildings and structures in the Czech Republic